Scott Rosenbaum is an American film and television screenwriter, producer, and showrunner. He has served as the executive producer and showrunner of multiple series including ABC's science fiction drama V, Fox's crime drama Gang Related, NBC's Chuck and as an executive producer on FX's drama The Shield. As an original member of The Shield writing staff, Rosenbaum won a Golden Globe for Best Drama, an American Film Institute Award for Best Television Drama as well as the George Foster Peabody Award. He is currently the executive producer and showrunner of Queen of the South for USA Network.

Education and personal life 
Rosenbaum graduated from the University of Michigan and is married to television director Elizabeth Allen Rosenbaum.

Filmography 
 Sandokan (2021), executive producer, creator
 Viva La Madness (2019), executive producer, creator
 Queen of the South (2016), executive producer
 Gang Related (2014), executive producer
 V (2010–2011), executive producer
 Chuck (2007–2010), executive producer
 The Shield (2002–2007), executive producer

References

External links 

 

American television producers
American television writers
American male television writers
Living people
Place of birth missing (living people)
Year of birth missing (living people)
University of Michigan alumni